In the United States, college football has been played since the 1869 season when Princeton and Rutgers played the first game. In the early years of the game, Harvard University and McGill University developed a rivalry that is credited with the establishment of modern American football. The first game played outside the United States occurred on October 23, 1874, when the Crimson defeated McGill 3–0 at Montreal, Quebec. Several other games were played during the early years of the game in Canada until the differences between American and Canadian football became significant enough that Canadian and American universities ceased playing one-another. In addition to the early Canadian games, several teams competed in the Bacardi Bowl at Havana, Cuba until it was discontinued after the 1946 edition of the game.

Although not common, National Collegiate Athletic Association (NCAA) rules allow for member institutions to compete in regular season games scheduled in foreign countries no more than once every four years. The first of these games occurred in 1976 when Grambling State defeated Morgan State in the Pioneer Bowl at Korakuen Stadium in Tokyo. After that initial game, a regular season game called the Mirage Bowl (later called the Coca-Cola Classic) was played in Tokyo from 1977 to 1993. Since 1977, regular season games have also been played in Australia, Bermuda, Germany, Ireland, Italy, and the United Kingdom.

In April 2006, the NCAA announced Toronto was awarded a postseason bowl game to be played at Rogers Centre. The International Bowl was the first bowl game played outside the United States since the Bacardi Bowl in 1937. However, the game was discontinued after its 2010 edition. Two international games were played as part of the 2014 NCAA Division I FBS football season. Penn State and UCF played their season opener in the Croke Park Classic at Dublin, and the Bahamas Bowl had its inaugural edition at Thomas Robinson Stadium in Nassau in December 2014 and its second edition on December 24, 2015. The Bahamas Bowl has continued as part of the bowl schedule ever since. Two regular-season games were scheduled for 2016: the first game of the season, with California and Hawaii playing at ANZ Stadium in Sydney, and a return to Dublin's Aviva Stadium, this time with Boston College playing Georgia Tech.

In addition to those played, several international games have been proposed from time-to-time that were never actually played. In 1989, USC and Illinois were scheduled to open their season in the Glasnost Bowl at Dynamo Stadium in Moscow. However, the game was canceled and moved to the Los Angeles Memorial Coliseum due to the logistics of undertaking a college football game in the Soviet Union. In 1996, the Haka Bowl was scheduled for play at Auckland, New Zealand, but its certification was subsequently revoked by the NCAA due to financing concerns. In 2013, bowl games were proposed for both Dublin, Ireland and Dubai, United Arab Emirates, but neither was certified by the NCAA for play. In both 2020 and 2021, the Emerald Isle Classic played at Dublin, Ireland was canceled due to the impacts of the COVID-19 pandemic. The Ireland event returned for 2022, with a new sponsored name of Aer Lingus College Football Classic.

Games

Division I-A/FBS

Notes

References
General

Specific

College football games
Games played outside the United States